Uptown Charlotte, also called Center City, is the central business district of Charlotte, North Carolina. The area is split into four wards by the intersection of Trade and Tryon Streets, and bordered by Interstate 277 and Interstate 77. The area is managed and overseen by the Charlotte Central City Partners, which is one of the three Municipal Service Districts in Charlotte. Uptown Charlotte is the largest business district in Charlotte and the Carolinas.

Several Fortune 500 companies have their headquarters in the district, including Bank of America, Duke Energy, Honeywell, and the east coast operations of Wells Fargo. Uptown contains over 33 million square feet of office space. Athletic and event facilities located in Center City include Bank of America Stadium, Spectrum Center, Truist Field, and the NASCAR Hall of Fame. Museums, theaters, hotels, high-density residential developments, restaurants, and bars are heavily concentrated in the Center City, with over 245 restaurants and 50 nightspots.

Name origins
Charlotte's central business district is referred to as "Uptown" by locals, although the term "Downtown" is understood and used by native Charlotteans since it references the same area of the city. There is some confusion brought about by the use of the terms "Uptown" and "Downtown" for Charlotte's center city area. The term "Up-Town", referring to the geographic location of Tryon and Trade Street—“uptown” actually does sit at a higher elevation than the rest of the city—was recorded as early as 1895 in the Charlotte Observer but fell out of use around 1929 for reasons unknown. The term "Downtown" was commonly used up until the mid-1970s by residents, media, and city leaders for the Center City. In 1973, a massive campaign was launched by local businessman Jack Wood to revamp the image of the downtown area and embrace the historic and arguably uniquely Charlotte term "Uptown" by reintroducing it to the general public. In September 1974 Charlotte City Council passed an official proclamation that said "The heart of Charlotte should be now and forever more known as Uptown Charlotte." On February 14, 1987, the Charlotte Observer began using the term "Uptown" as a way to promote a more positive upbeat image of the Center City area.  School teachers were provided with "historical" documents justifying use of the term to teach to students.

Major streets

Tryon Street 

Tryon Street is a major north–south street of Charlotte, North Carolina. It traverses through the center of Uptown Charlotte and is the address for some of the city's tallest buildings, such as the Bank of America Corporate Center and Truist Center. U.S. Route 29 and North Carolina Highway 49 are signed along portions of Tryon Street (although they both deviate onto Graham Street through Uptown). The road is divided into two segments at its intersection with Trade Street: North Tryon Street and South Tryon Street. Likewise, Tryon Street divides Trade Street into east and west. The Trade and Tryon intersection serves as the dividing point for the city's first four wards, as well as the center of its address grid. The street was named after William Tryon, governor of the Province of North Carolina from 1765 to 1771.

Entering the Charlotte city limits from the north, US 29's street name changes from Concord Parkway to North Tryon Street. US 29 and Tryon Street continue southwest through the University City neighborhood, passing by the PNC Music Pavilion, intersecting with Interstate 485 (North Carolina), and passing through the University of North Carolina at Charlotte, where NC 49 joins in from University City Boulevard.

South Tryon Street terminates at the Charlotte city limits at the Steele Creek neighborhood, where it changes to York Road. NC 49 continues west to Lake Wylie, South Carolina, where it becomes Charlotte Highway and SC 49 begins.

Buildings which have a Tryon Street address include:
 Bank of America Corporate Center
 One South at The Plaza
 Duke Energy Center
 Truist Center
 Fifth Third Center
 400 South Tryon
 525 North Tryon
 200 South Tryon
 300 South Tryon
 112 Tryon Plaza
 South Tryon Square
 Legacy Union
 Two Wells Fargo Center
 201 South Tryon

Trade Street 
Trade Street is the major east–west street that divides the northern and southern wards in the city of Charlotte, North Carolina. The following towers have a Trade Street address:
 121 West Trade
 129 West Trade
 Carillon Tower

College Street 
Buildings which have a College Street address include:
 One Wells Fargo Center
 Charlotte Plaza
 Regions 615
 BB&T Center

Neighborhoods
Uptown Charlotte is divided into four neighborhoods, or "wards", by the intersection of Trade and Tryon Streets.

First Ward

First Ward lies directly to the east of the intersection of Trade and Tryon.  It is that quadrant bounded by North Tryon on the northwest and East Trade on the southwest.

Once considered one of the most dangerous areas in Charlotte, the first ward has become one of the more desirable because of gentrification under a HUD HOPE VI grants with many new developments are under construction. The award-winning Center City Building which houses the uptown campus of the University of North Carolina at Charlotte is in the first ward. The Center City Building is 11 stories and was completed in 2011.  it includes 25 state of the art classrooms, design studios, meeting space, and performance spaces. Current attractions include the Main Library, the Spirit Square portion of the North Carolina Blumenthal Performing Arts Center, ImaginOn Children's Learning Center, Levine Museum of the New South, the Spectrum Center (home of the Charlotte Hornets).

Second Ward
The second ward lies directly to the south of the intersection of Trade and Tryon. It is the quadrant bounded by South Tryon on the northwest and East Trade on the northeast. Second Ward is the hospitality center of Uptown with about half of the hotel rooms in Uptown and it is an important employment center as well.
It is the location of Charlotte's "Government District" and is the site of the NASCAR Hall of Fame. The second ward was formerly the location of the predominantly black neighborhood, Brooklyn, before an urban renewal project took place. Today, second ward is home to Queen City Quarter, a mixed-use entertainment and retail complex; the Charlotte Convention Center; the Victorian Gothic style St. Peter's Catholic Church; The Green, a downtown mini-park; and the Harvey B. Gantt Center for African-American Art+Culture (named for Harvey Gantt). Duke Energy also has its corporate headquarters in the second ward.

Third Ward

The third ward lies directly to the west of the intersection of Trade and Tryon. It is the quadrant bounded by South Tryon on the southeast and West Trade on the northeast. It is the Ward that house a lot of the entertainment and culture attractions in Uptown which include Knight Theatre, the Mint Museum, and the Bechtler Museum of Modern Art, the Carolina Panthers' and Charlotte FC's Bank of America Stadium, Truist Field, home of the Charlotte Knights, opened in 2014, Romare Bearden Park, which opened in September 2013, and Gateway Village. Johnson & Wales University's Charlotte campus is located directly across from Gateway Village, with Johnson C. Smith University's campus located adjacent. Third ward is also the site of the upcoming Gateway Station transportation hub, which began construction in July 2018. The Gateway Station will house a Greyhound bus stop, an Amtrak station, LYNX Silver Line, and a CATS bus hub.

Fourth Ward

The fourth ward lies directly to the north of the intersection of Trade and Tryon.  It is that quadrant bounded by North Tryon on the southeast and West Trade on the southwest.

It is mostly residential and has many stately Victorian homes. It is an official historic district, and is the location of Old Settlers' Cemetery and the three-acre Fourth Ward Park. It is a blend of historic residential neighborhoods, modern restaurants, and an employment center.

Economy 
 
 

As of 2021 Uptown Charlotte employs 120,000 people across 33 million square feet of office space, hosts more than 18 million visitors a year, and is home to 35,000 residents.

Charlotte is the second largest banking center in the country behind New York City. This determination is made by the dollar amount of assets held by banks headquartered in the city. The current banks with headquarters in the city are Bank of America with $2.8 trillion in assets as of 2020 and Truist Financial with $509 billion in assets as of 2020.  Both bank have their headquarters in Uptown.  Bank of America at 100 North Tryon Bank of America Corporate Center and Truist at 214 North Tryon Truist Center.  Uptown has also become a hub of large bank employment bases.  Wells Fargo, whose Charlotte presence was Wachovia prior to being acquired by Wells Fargo, occupies numerous buildings in Uptown including Duke Energy Center, One Wells Fargo Center, Two Wells Fargo Center, Three Wells Fargo Center, and 300 South Brevard.  Other banks that have a large employment base in Uptown are Ally Financial with 2,100 employees located in Ally Charlotte Center and U.S. Bank with 860 employees located in Truist Center.

Companies with headquarters in Uptown
 Bank of America
 Truist Financial
 Wells Fargo East Coast operations
 Duke Energy
 Barings
 Honeywell 
 Dole Food Company
 NASCAR 
 Atlantic Coast Conference
 Passport
 AvidxChange

Companies with large corporate presence in Uptown
 U.S. Bank
 Ally Financial
 FNB Corporation
 Deloitte
 The Bank of London

Hotels  

Uptown currently has 6,404 existing hotel rooms with 859 rooms planned.
  The hotels planned or under construction include the Intercontinental Hotel at Belk Place with 257 rooms, Brooklyn Village with 280 rooms, 
Homewood Suites Uptown with 213 rooms, Moxy Hotel with 208, and Element Stonewall Station with 181 rooms.

Uptown needs more hotel rooms within walking distance from the Convention Center to attract more world class events.  Charlotte's current hotel rooms count is fewer than it's competitors for conventions.

Austin: 13,629
Baltimore: 8,766
Indianapolis: 8,487
Louisville: 9,408
Nashville: 20,108
Tampa: 14,104

One step the city is taking to change this a land swap with developer Millennium Venture Capital.  The city will give MVC 1.9 acres of its property at 501 S. Caldwell St. in exchanged for 0.7 acres at 401 S College, which is located next to the Charlotte Convention Center.  MVC closed on this 2.3 acre lot on December 16, 2022.  The land will ideally be used for a convention center hotel which is 800 to 1,000.  However, the city is unwilling to offer any public inventive for the hotel.

Construction boom 

Due to the Great Recession's effect on Charlotte construction in Uptown was at a virtual stand still between 2010 and 2014. The ground breaking of 300 South Tryon began a building boom in Uptown. Between 2000 and 2010 6 million square feet of office space was added to Uptown.  In 2019 6.9 million square feet of office space was under construction or planned, 8,458 housing units were under construction or planned, 2,310 hotel rooms were under construction or planned, 948,167 square feet of retail was under construction or planned.  This pipeline includes a number of projects such as the Duke Energy Plaza, Seventh and Tryon which is part of the North Tryon Vision project, 10 Tryon, Ally Charlotte Center, JW Marriott Charlotte, FNB Tower, 650 S. Tryon, The Ellis, 500 W. Trade.  Unfortunately three hotels have stalled due to the COVID-19 pandemic they are the Moxy Hotel, Intercontinental Hotel at Belk Place, and the Hotel at The Ellis.

Companies consolidating real estate has been a major factor in new commercial construction.  Three such buildings that are a part of real estate consolidation are Ally Charlotte Center, Duke Energy Plaza, and the Bank of America Tower each is building a bigger building to unite at least two offices under the same roof.  In the case of Ally Charlotte Center and Duke Energy Plaza it is at least 4 offices.  Part of the consolidation efforts have been brought up by adopting a hybrid model of work after returning from the Covid-19 pandemic where most workers will work part time or full time from home.  Obviously a smaller real estate foot print is needed.  Duke Energy specifically is aiming to cuts its real estate foot print from 2.5 million square feet to 1 million by 2050.

One of the areas of Uptown that has seen the most development since 2015 to 2021 is the Stonewall Corridor which runs along Stonewall Street and next to I-277 South from McDowell St to Bank of America Stadium. The primary reason for the boom of the corridor is the abundance of land along Stonewall Street.  After the I-277 interchanges were shrunk 5  big parcels of land each at least 2 acres were available on the north side of I-277.  One of the first new buildings on Stonewall to start the building boom was Regions 615 which delivered in the Spring of 2017 since then the Bank of America Tower completed in early 2019, Honeywell Tower began construction in September 2019, Ally Charlotte Center delivered in May 2021 and many other buildings.

Education

Elementary, Middle and High schools 
Brookstone Schools
First Ward Creative Arts Academy
Charlotte Lab School
Metro School
Trinity Episcopal School
Charlotte Montessori School

Colleges and universities
Johnson and Wales University, Charlotte campus
University of North Carolina at Charlotte, Uptown campus
Johnson C. Smith University
Central Piedmont Community College 
Wake Forest University School of Business, Charlotte campus
Northeastern University, Charlotte campus

Libraries

Charlotte Center City is served by two branches of the Public Library of Charlotte and Mecklenburg County now known as Charlotte Mecklenburg Library.  The Main library is located on North Tryon Street. In November 2019, new designs for the $100 million, 115,000-square-foot Main Library in Uptown Charlotte were revealed. The organization is planning to break ground in 2021 and complete the build in early 2024.

ImaginOn: The Joe and Joan Martin Center is located on east Seventh Street. ImaginOn is a collaborative venture of Charlotte Mecklenburg Library and the Children's Theater of Charlotte.  The library provides services, books, CDs, DVDs and homework support for children and teens. ImaginOn contains the McColl Family Theatre and the Wachovia Playhouse, venues used by the Children's Theater for their performances.

Parks, recreation, and culture

Parks 

 Romare Bearden Park
 First Ward Park
 Fourth Ward Park
 The Green
 Marshall Park

Entertainment venues

Uptown Charlotte has two major league sports venues. Bank of America Stadium, home of the Carolina Panthers and Charlotte FC, opened in 1996; and the Spectrum Center, home of the Charlotte Hornets, opened in 2005; The Charlotte Knights, a minor league baseball team, play at Truist Field.

The Charlotte Convention Center attracts over 500,000 people a year to its  of exhibit space. The Convention Center is currently undergoing an expansion to add an additional  of meeting space and a pedestrian bridge connection to the adjacent Westin hotel.

Within recent years, multiple museums have opened in Uptown. The first phase of the Levine Center for the Arts opened in 2010, as part of the then-named Wachovia Cultural Campus. List of museums in Uptown:

 Bechtler Museum of Modern Art
 Charlotte-Mecklenburg Fire Education Center and Museum
 Discovery Place
 Harvey B. Gantt Center for African-American Arts + Culture
 The Light Factory
 McColl Center for Art + Innovation
 Mint Museum
 NASCAR Hall of Fame 
 Museum of Illusions Charlotte
 Second Ward Alumni House Museum
 AvidxChange Music Factory

Performing arts
Blumenthal Performing Arts Center
Carolina Theatre
Levine Center for the Arts 
Knight Theater

Media 
The Charlotte Observer has its headquarters in Uptown Charlotte.

Transportation 

Uptown Charlotte is surrounded by Interstate 277, an auxiliary highway which creates the boundaries of the four wards and is the innermost of the city's three ring roads. Interstate 77 also runs parallel to the west of Uptown's third and fourth wards. The Lynx Blue Line runs through Uptown, connecting Uptown to Charlotte's University City to the northeast and Interstate 485 to the southwest via light rail.

See also
 List of tallest buildings in North Carolina / the United States / the world
 List of tallest buildings in Charlotte, North Carolina
 Charlotte, North Carolina
 List of Charlotte neighborhoods

References

External links 

  Charlotte Center City
Living Uptown Charlotte

Neighborhoods in Charlotte, North Carolina
Economy of Charlotte, North Carolina
Central business districts in the United States